Borri is a surname of Italian origin, born particularly, in Italy, by an ancient Milanese and Parmesan family, related to the Visconti. Notable people with the surname include:

Bonacossa Borri, also known as Bonaca, or Bonaccossi Bonacosta (1254–1321), Lady of Milan
Christoforo Borri, also called Christopher Borrus (1583–1632), Italian Jesuit missionary in Vietnam, mathematician, and astronomer
Francesca Borri (born 1980), Italian journalist and writer
Giuseppe Francesco Borri (1627–1695), Italian alchemist, prophet and doctor
Joe Borri (born 1962), American artist and writer
Paola Borri, Italian physicist
Squarcino Borri, also called Scarsini (1230–1277), Italian condottiero and lord of the lands of Santo Stefano Ticino

Italian-language surnames